Oralia López Hernández (born 16 October 1959) is a Mexican politician from the National Action Party. From 2009 to 2012 she served as Deputy of the LXI Legislature of the Mexican Congress representing Tlaxcala.

References

1959 births
Living people
Politicians from Tlaxcala
Women members of the Chamber of Deputies (Mexico)
National Action Party (Mexico) politicians
21st-century Mexican politicians
21st-century Mexican women politicians
Municipal presidents in Tlaxcala
Meritorious Autonomous University of Puebla alumni
Autonomous University of Tlaxcala alumni
20th-century Mexican politicians
20th-century Mexican women politicians
Deputies of the LXI Legislature of Mexico
Members of the Chamber of Deputies (Mexico) for Tlaxcala